Magnolia is a large genus of about 210 to 340 flowering plant species in the subfamily Magnolioideae of the family Magnoliaceae. It is named after French botanist Pierre Magnol.

Magnolia is an ancient genus. Appearing before bees evolved, the flowers are theorized to have evolved to encourage pollination by beetles.
To avoid damage from pollinating beetles, the carpels of Magnolia flowers are extremely tough.  Fossilized specimens of M. acuminata have been found dating to 20 million years ago, and fossils of plants identifiably belonging to the Magnoliaceae date to 95 million years ago. Another aspect of Magnolia considered to represent an ancestral state is that the flower bud is enclosed in a bract rather than in sepals; the perianth parts are undifferentiated and called tepals rather than distinct sepals and petals. Magnolia shares the tepal characteristic with several other flowering plants near the base of the flowering plant lineage such as Amborella and Nymphaea (as well as with many more recently derived plants such as Lilium).

The natural range of Magnolia species is a disjunct distribution, with a main center in east and southeast Asia and a secondary center in eastern North America, Central America, the West Indies, and some species in South America.

Description

Magnolias are spreading, evergreen or deciduous trees or shrubs, characterised by large fragrant flowers which may be bowl-shaped or star-shaped, in shades of white, pink, purple, green or yellow. In deciduous species the blooms often appear before the leaves, in spring. Cone-like fruits are often produced in autumn.

As with all Magnoliaceae, the perianth is undifferentiated, with  9–15 tepals in three or more whorls. The flowers are bisexual with numerous adnate carpels and stamens are arranged in a spiral fashion on the elongated receptacle. The fruit dehisces along the dorsal sutures of the carpels. The pollen is monocolpate, and the embryo development is of the Polygonum type.

Taxonomists, including James E. Dandy in 1927, have long had an interest in observing fruits of Magnoliaceae and have often used the differences, or perceived differences, in fruit characters to justify systems for classification.

Taxonomy

History

Early

The name Magnolia first appeared in 1703 in the Genera of Charles Plumier (1646–1704), for a flowering tree from the island of Martinique (talauma). It was named after the French botanist Pierre Magnol. English botanist William Sherard, who studied botany in Paris under Joseph Pitton de Tournefort, a pupil of Magnol, was most probably the first after Plumier to adopt the genus name Magnolia. He was at least responsible for the taxonomic part of Johann Jacob Dillenius's Hortus Elthamensis and of Mark Catesby's Natural History of Carolina, Florida and the Bahama Islands. These were the first works after Plumier's Genera that used the name Magnolia, this time for some species of flowering trees from temperate North America. The species that Plumier originally named Magnolia was later described as Annona dodecapetala by Lamarck, and has since been named Magnolia plumieri and Talauma plumieri (and still a number of other names) but is now known as Magnolia dodecapetala.

Carl Linnaeus, who was familiar with Plumier's Genera, adopted the genus name Magnolia in 1735 in his first edition of Systema Naturae, without a description, but with a reference to Plumier's work. In 1753, he took up Plumier's Magnolia in the first edition of Species Plantarum. There he described a monotypic genus, with the sole species being Magnolia virginiana. Since Linnaeus never saw a herbarium specimen (if there ever was one) of Plumier's Magnolia and had only his description and a rather poor picture at hand, he must have taken it for the same plant which was described by Catesby in his 1730 Natural History of Carolina.  He placed it in the synonymy of Magnolia virginiana var. fœtida, the taxon now known as Magnolia grandiflora. Under Magnolia virginiana Linnaeus described five varieties (glauca, fœtida, grisea, tripetala, and acuminata). In the tenth edition of Systema Naturae (1759), he merged grisea with glauca, and raised the four remaining varieties to species status.

By the end of the 18th century, botanists and plant hunters exploring Asia began to name and describe the Magnolia species from China and Japan. The first Asiatic species to be described by western botanists were Magnolia denudata, Magnolia liliiflora, Magnolia coco and Magnolia figo. Soon after that, in 1794, Carl Peter Thunberg collected and described Magnolia obovata from Japan and at roughly the same time Magnolia kobus was also first collected.

Recent
With the number of species increasing, the genus was divided into the two subgenera Magnolia and Yulania. Magnolia contains the American evergreen species M. grandiflora, which is of horticultural importance, especially in the southeastern United States, and M. virginiana, the type species. Yulania contains several deciduous Asiatic species, such as M. denudata and M. kobus, which have become horticulturally important in their own right and as parents in hybrids. Classified in Yulania, is also the American deciduous M. acuminata (cucumber tree), which has recently attained greater status as the parent responsible for the yellow flower color in many new hybrids.

Relations in the family Magnoliaceae have been puzzling taxonomists for a long time. Because the family is quite old and has survived many geological events (such as ice ages, mountain formation, and continental drift), its distribution has become scattered. Some species or groups of species have been isolated for a long time, while others could stay in close contact. To create divisions in the family (or even within the genus Magnolia), solely based upon morphological characters, has proven to be a nearly impossible task.

By the end of the 20th century, DNA sequencing had become available as a method of large-scale research on phylogenetic relationships. Several studies, including studies on many species in the family Magnoliaceae, were carried out to investigate relationships. What these studies all revealed was that genus Michelia and Magnolia subgenus Yulania were far more closely allied to each other than either one of them was to Magnolia subgenus Magnolia. These phylogenetic studies were supported by morphological data.

As nomenclature is supposed to reflect relationships, the situation with the species names in Michelia and Magnolia subgenus Yulania was undesirable. Taxonomically, three choices are available:

 to join Michelia and Yulania species in a common genus, not being Magnolia (for which the name Michelia has priority);
 to raise subgenus Yulania to generic rank, leaving Michelia names and subgenus Magnolia names untouched, or;
 to join Michelia with genus Magnolia into genus Magnolia s.l. (a big genus).

Magnolia subgenus Magnolia cannot be renamed because it contains M. virginiana, the type species of the genus and of the family.

Not many Michelia species have so far become horticulturally or economically important, apart for their wood. Both subgenus Magnolia and subgenus Yulania include species of major horticultural importance, and a change of name would be very undesirable for many people, especially in the horticultural branch. In Europe, Magnolia even is more or less a synonym for Yulania, since most of the cultivated species on this continent have Magnolia (Yulania) denudata as one of their parents. Most taxonomists who acknowledge close relations between Yulania and Michelia therefore support the third option and join Michelia with Magnolia.

The same goes, mutatis mutandis, for the (former) genera Talauma and Dugandiodendron, which are then placed in subgenus Magnolia, and genus Manglietia, which could be joined with subgenus Magnolia or may even earn the status of an extra subgenus. Elmerrillia seems to be closely related to Michelia and Yulania, in which case it will most likely be treated in the same way as Michelia is now. The precise nomenclatural status of small or monospecific genera like Kmeria, Parakmeria, Pachylarnax, Manglietiastrum, Aromadendron, Woonyoungia, Alcimandra, Paramichelia and Tsoongiodendron remains uncertain. Taxonomists who merge Michelia into Magnolia tend to merge these small genera into Magnolia s.l. as well. Botanists do not yet agree on whether to recognize a big Magnolia or the different small genera. For example, Flora of China offers two choices: a large genus Magnolia which includes about 300 species, everything in the Magnoliaceae except Liriodendron (tulip tree), or 16 different genera, some of them recently split out or re-recognized, each of which contains up to 50 species. The western co-author favors the big genus Magnolia, whereas the Chinese recognize the different small genera.

Fossil record 
Fossils assignable to Magnolia extend into the Paleogene, such as Magnolia nanningensis, named for mummified wood from the Oligocene of Guangxi, China, which has a close affinity to members of the modern secton Michelia.

Subdivision
In 2012, the Magnolia Society published on its website a classification of the genus produced by Richard B. Figlar, based on a 2004 classification by Figlar and Hans Peter Nooteboom. Species of Magnolia were listed under three subgenera, 12 sections, and 13 subsections. Subsequent molecular phylogenetic studies have led to some revisions of this system; for example, the subgenus Magnolia was found not to be monophyletic. A revised classification in 2020, based on a phylogenetic analysis of complete chloroplast genomes, abandoned subgenera and subsections, dividing Magnolia into 15 sections. The relationships among these sections are shown in the following cladogram, as is the paraphyletic status of subgenus Magnolia.

The table below compares the 2012 and 2020 classifications. (The exact circumscriptions of the corresponding taxa may not be the same.)

Species
The species lists below are divided according to the Magnolia Society's 2012 classification.

Subgenus Magnolia
Anthers open by splitting at the front facing the centre of the flower, deciduous or evergreen, flowers produced after the leaves.

Section Magnolia
 Magnolia faustinomirandae A.Vázquez - (Mexico)
 Magnolia grandiflora L. - (SE US)
 Magnolia guatemalensis Donn. Sm. - (Guatemala, Honduras, El Salvador)
 Magnolia guatemalensis subsp. guatemalensis (Guatemala)
 Magnolia guatemalensis subsp. hondurensis (Molina) Vazquez (Honduras, El Salvador)
 Magnolia guerrerensis J.Jiménez Ram., K.Vega & Cruz Durán (Mexico)
 Magnolia iltisiana Vazquez (W Mexico)
 Magnolia krusei J.Jiménez Ram. & Cruz Durán (Mexico)
 Magnolia oaxacensis A.Vázquez (Mexico)
 Magnolia pacifica Vazquez (W Mexico)
 Magnolia pacifica subsp. pacifica (W Mexico)
 Magnolia pacifica subsp. pugana Iltis & Vazquez (W Mexico)
 Magnolia panamensis Vazquez & Iltis (Panama)
 Magnolia pedrazae A.Vázquez (Mexico)
 Magnolia poasana (Pittier) Dandy (Costa Rica, Panama)
Magnolia poqomchi 
 Magnolia schiedeana Schltdl. (E Mexico)
 Magnolia sharpii Meranda (Chiapas (Mexico))
 Magnolia sororum Seibert (Costa Rica, Panama)
 Magnolia sororum subsp. lutea Vazquez. (Costa Rica, Panama)
 Magnolia sororum subsp. sororum (Panama)
 Magnolia tamaulipana Vazquez - Mexican evergreen magnolia (NE Mexico)
 Magnolia tarahumara (Vazquez) A.Vázquez (W Mexico)
 Magnolia vazquezii Cruz Durán & K.Vega (Mexico)
 Magnolia virginiana L. (SE US)
 Magnolia yoroconte Dandy (Guatemala, Honduras, Belize)
 Magnolia zamudioi A.Vázquez (Mexico)

Section Gwillimia

Subsection Gwillimia
 Magnolia albosericea Chun & Tsoong. (Hainan (China))
 Magnolia bawangensis Law, R.Z.Zhou & D.M.Liu (Hainan (China))
 Magnolia championii Benth (S & SE China)
 Magnolia clemensiorum Dandy (Vietnam)
 Magnolia coco (Lour.) DC. (SE China)
 Magnolia delavayi Franchet (Yunnan (China))
 Magnolia fistulosa (Finet & Gagnep.) Dandy (SE Yunnan (China))
 Magnolia henryi Dunn (Yunnan (China))
 Magnolia nana Dandy (Vietnam)
 Magnolia odoratissima Law et Zhou (S China)
 Magnolia pterocarpa Roxb. (Nepal, Burma)
 Magnolia xiana Noot. (China)

Subsection Blumiana
 Magnolia angatensis Blanco (Philippines)
 Magnolia betongensis (Craib) H.Keng (Borneo)
 Magnolia gigantifolia (Miq.) Noot. (Borneo, Sumatra)
 Magnolia hodgsonii (Hook.f. & Thom.) H.Keng (Nepal, Burma)
 Magnolia lasia Noot. (Borneo)
 Magnolia liliifera (L.) Baillon (SE Asia, Borneo, Philippines, Singapore, Sumatra)
 Magnolia liliifera var. angatensis (Blanco) Noot. (Philippines)
 Magnolia liliifera var. beccarii (Ridley) Noot. (Borneo)
 Magnolia liliifera var. liliifera (SE Asia)
 Magnolia liliifera var. obovata (Korth.) Govaerts (Borneo)
 Magnolia liliifera var. singapurensis (Ridley) Noot. (Singapore, Sumatra)
 Magnolia mariusjacobsia Noot. (Borneo)
 Magnolia persuaveolens Dandy (Borneo)
 Magnolia persuaveolens subsp. persuaveolens (Borneo)
 Magnolia persuaveolens subsp. rigida Noot. (Borneo)
 Magnolia rabaniana Hook.f. & Thomson D.C.S.Raju & M.P.Nayer (India)
 Magnolia sarawakensis (Agostini) Noot. (Borneo)
 Magnolia singapurensis (Ridl.) H.Keng (Singapore, Sumatra)
 Magnolia villosa (Miq.) H.Keng (Sumatra, Borneo)

Section Talauma

Subsection Talauma
 Magnolia allenii Standl. (Panama)
 Magnolia amazonica (Ducke) Govaerts (Brazil, Peru)
 Magnolia arcabucoana (Lozano) Govaerts (Colombia)
 Magnolia bankardiorum  M.O.Dillon & Sánchez Vega (Peru)
 Magnolia boliviana (M.Nee) Govaerts (Bolivia)
 Magnolia caricifragrans (Lozano) Govaerts (Colombia)
 Magnolia cespedesii (Triana & Planch) Govaerts (Colombia)
 Magnolia chocoensis (Lozano) Govaerts (Colombia)
 Magnolia coronata M.Serna, C.Velásquez & Cogollo (Colombia)
 Magnolia dixonii (Little) Govaerts (Ecuador)
 Magnolia dodecapetala (Lam.) Govaerts (Lesser Antilles)
 Magnolia espinalii (Lozano) Govaerts (Colombia)
 Magnolia georgii (Lozano) Govaerts (Colombia)
 Magnolia gilbertoi (Lozano) Govaerts (Colombia)
 Magnolia gloriensis (Pittier) Govaerts (Central America)
 Magnolia henaoi (Lozano) Govaerts (Colombia)
 Magnolia hernandezii (Lozano) Govaerts (Colombia)
 Magnolia irwiniana (Lozano) Govaerts (Brazil)
 Magnolia jardinensis M.Serna, C.Velásquez & Cogollo (Colombia)
 Magnolia katiorum (Lozano) Govaerts (Colombia)
 Magnolia lacandonica Vazquez-Garcia, Perez-Farrera, Martinez-Camilo, Muniz-Castro & Martinez-Melendez (Mexico)
 Magnolia manguillo Marcelo-Peña & F. Arroyo (Peru)
 Magnolia mexicana DC. (Mexico)
 Magnolia minor (Urb.) Govaerts (Cuba)
 Magnolia morii (Lozano) Govaerts (Panama)
 Magnolia narinensis (Lozano) Govaerts (Colombia)
 Magnolia neillii (Lozano) Govaerts (Ecuador)
 Magnolia ovata (A.St.-Hil.) Spreng. (Brazil)
 Magnolia polyhypsophylla (Lozano) Govaerts (Colombia)
 Magnolia quetzal Vazquez-Garcia, Veliz-Perez, Triboullier-Navas & Muniz-Castro (Guatemala)
 Magnolia rimachii (Lozano) Govaerts (Peru, Ecuador)
 Magnolia sambuensis (Pittier) Govaerts (Panama, Colombia)
 Magnolia santanderiana (Lozano) Govaerts (Colombia)
 Magnolia sellowiana (A.St.-Hil.) Govaerts (Brazil)
 Magnolia silvioi (Lozano) Govaerts (Colombia)
 Magnolia venezuelensis (Lozano) Govaerts (Venezuela)
 Magnolia virolinensis (Lozano) Govaerts (Colombia)
 Magnolia wolfii (Lozano) Govaerts (Colombia)

Subsection Dugandiodendron
 Magnolia argyrothricha (Lozano) Govaerts (Colombia)
 Magnolia calimaensis (Lozano) Govaerts (Colombia)
 Magnolia calophylla (Lozano) Govaerts (Colombia)
 Magnolia cararensis (Lozano) Govaerts (Colombia)
 Magnolia chimantensis Steyermark & Maguire – “Chimanta magnolia” (Venezuela)
 Magnolia colombiana (Little) Govaerts (Colombia)
 Magnolia guatapensis (Lozano) Govaerts (Colombia)
 Magnolia jaenensis Marcelo-Peña (Peru)
 Magnolia lenticellata (Lozano) Govaerts (Colombia)
 Magnolia magnifolia (Lozano) Govaerts (Colombia)
 Magnolia mahechae (Lozano) Govaerts (Colombia)
 Magnolia ptaritepuiana Steyermark – “ptari-tepui magnolia” (Venezuela)
 Magnolia striatifolia Little (Colombia, Ecuador)
 Magnolia urraoense (Lozano) Govaerts (Colombia)
 Magnolia yarumalense (Lozano) Govaerts (Colombia)

Subsection Cubenses
 Magnolia cristalensis Bisse (Cuba)
 Magnolia cubensis Urb. (Cuba)
 Magnolia domingensis Urb. (Haiti, Dominican Rep.)
 Magnolia ekmannii Urb. (Haiti)
 Magnolia emarginata Urb. & Ekman (Haiti)
 Magnolia hamorii Howard (Dominican Rep.)
 Magnolia pallescens Urb. & Ekman (Dom. Rep.)
 Magnolia portoricensis Bello (Puerto Rico)
 Magnolia splendens Urban (Puerto Rico)

Section Manglietia
 Magnolia aromatica (Dandy) V.S.Kumar (S China)
 Magnolia blaoensis (Gagnep.) Dandy (Vietnam)
 Magnolia blumei Prantl (Sumatra, Java)
 Magnolia blumei var. blumei (Sumatra, Java)
 Magnolia blumei var. sumatrana (Miq.) Figlar & Noot. (W Sumatra)
 Magnolia calophylloides Figlar & Noot. (W Sumatra)
 Magnolia caveana (Hook.f. & Thoms.) D.C.Raju & M.P.Nayer (Assam, N Burma)
 Magnolia changhuntana Noot. (Guangdong (China))
 Magnolia chevalieri (Dandy) V.S.Kumar (Vietnam, Laos)
 Magnolia conifera (Dandy) V.S.Kumar (SE China, Vietnam)
 Magnolia conifera var. chingii (Dandy) V.S.Kumar (SE China)
 Magnolia conifera var. conifera (SE China, Vietnam)
 Magnolia crassipes (Y.W.Law) V.S.Kumar (Guangdong (China))
 Magnolia dandyi (Gapnep.) Dandy (S China, Vietnam, Laos)
 Magnolia decidua (Q.Y.Zheng) V.S.Kumar (Jiangxi (China))
 Magnolia duclouxii Finet & Gagnep. (Vietnam, SW China)
 Magnolia figlarii V.S.Kumar (Sichuan (China))
 Magnolia fordiana (Oliv.) Hu (Vietnam, S China)
 Magnolia fordiana var. calcarea (X.H.Song) Chen & Noot. (Guizhou (China))
 Magnolia fordiana var. fordiana (Vietnam, S China)
 Magnolia fordiana var. forrestii (W.W.Sm. Ex Dandy) Chen & Noot. (SW China)
 Magnolia fordiana var. kwangtungensis (Merr.) Chen & Noot. (SE China)
 Magnolia garrettii (Craib) V.S.Kumar (SW China, Vietnam, Thailand)
 Magnolia grandis (Hu & W.C.Cheng) V.S.Kumar (Yunnan (China))
 Magnolia hongheensis (Y.M.Shui & W.H.Chen) V.S.Kumar (Yunnan (China))
 Magnolia hookeri Cubitt & W.W.Sm. (SW China, N Burma, Thailand)
 Magnolia insignis (Wall.) Blume (S China, Nepal, Burma)
 Magnolia kwangtungensis Merr. (SE China)
 Magnolia lanuginosoides Figlar & Noot. (Sumatra)
 Magnolia longipedunculata (Q.W.Zeng & Law) V.S.Kumar (Guangdong (China))
 Magnolia lucida (B.L. Chen & S.C. Yang) V.S. Kumar (SW China)
 Magnolia obovalifolia (C.Y.Yu & Law) V.S.Kumar (Yunnan (China))
 Magnolia ovoidea (H.T.Chang & B.L.Chen) V.S.Kumar (Yunnan (China))
 Magnolia patungensis (Hu) Noot. (China)
 Magnolia rufibarbata (Dandy) V.S. Kumar (Yunnan (China), Vietnam)
 Magnolia sabahensis (Dandy ex Noot.) Figlar & Noot. (Borneo)
 Magnolia sapaensis (N.H.Xia & Q.N.Vu) Grimshaw & Macer (Vietnam)
 Magnolia utilis (Dandy) V.S.Kumar (N Burma, Thailand)
 Magnolia ventii (N.V.Tiep) V.S.Kumar (Yunnan (China))
 Magnolia xinganensis Noot. (Guangxi (China))
 Magnolia yuyuanensis (Y.W.Law) V.S.Kumar (E China)
 Magnolia zhengyiana (N.H.Xia) Noot. (Yunnan (China))

Section Kmeria
 Magnolia duperreana Pierre (Vietnam, Cambodia)
 Magnolia kwangsiensis Figlar & Noot. (Yunnan, Guangxi (China))
 Magnolia thailandica Noot. & Chalermglin (Thailand)

Section Rhytidospermum

Subsection Rhytidospermum
 Magnolia obovata Thunb. (Japan)
 Magnolia officinalis Rehd. & Wilson (W China)
 Magnolia officinalis subsp. biloba Cheng & Law (E China)
 Magnolia officinalis subsp. officinalis (E China)
 Magnolia rostrata W.W.Smith (SW China)
 Magnolia tripetala (L.) L. (SE US)

Subsection Oyama
 Magnolia globosa Hook. f. & Thoms. (Nepal, Burma)
 Magnolia sieboldii K. Koch (Korea, E China, Japan)
 Magnolia sieboldii subsp. japonica K.Ueda (Japan, central China)
 Magnolia sieboldii subsp. sieboldii (Japan)
 Magnolia sieboldii subsp. sinensis (Rehd. & Wilson) Spongberg (central China)
 Magnolia wilsonii (Finet. & Gagnep.) Rehd. - Wilson's magnolia (SW China)

Section Auriculata 
 Magnolia fraseri Walt. - Fraser magnolia or ear-leaved magnolia (SE US)
 Magnolia fraseri var. fraseri - Fraser magnolia or ear-leaved magnolia (SE US)
 Magnolia fraseri var. pyramidata (Bartram) Pampanini - pyramid magnolia (SE US)

Section Macrophylla
 Magnolia dealbata Zuccarini (E Mexico) Sometimes treated as a subspecies, Magnolia macrophylla var. dealbata.
 Magnolia macrophylla Michx. (SE US, E Mexico)
 Magnolia macrophylla var. ashei (Weatherby) D. Johnson (SE US)
 Magnolia macrophylla var. macrophylla (SE US)
 Magnolia rzedowskiana A.Vázquez, Domínguez-Yescas & R.Pedraza (Querétaro, Mexico) 
 Magnolia nuevoleonensis A.Vázquez & Domínguez-Yescas (Nuevo León, Mexico)
 Magnolia vovidesii A.Vázquez, Domínguez-Yescas & L.Carvajal (Veracruz, Mexico)

Subgenus Yulania
Anthers open by splitting at the sides, deciduous, flowers mostly produced before leaves (except M. acuminata)

Section Yulania

Subsection Yulania
 Magnolia amoena W.C. Cheng (E China)
 Magnolia biondii Pampan (E China)
 Magnolia campbellii Hook. f. & Thomson (W China, Himalayas, India, Nepal, Assam)
 Magnolia campbellii var. alba Treseder (Himalayas)
 Magnolia campbellii var. campbellii. (Himalayas)
 Magnolia campbellii var. mollicomata (W.W. Smith) F. Kingdon-Ward (W China, Himalayas)
 Magnolia cylindrica Wilson (E China)
 Magnolia dawsoniana Rehd. & Wilson (Sichuan (China))
 Magnolia denudata Desr. (E China)
 Magnolia kobus DC. (Japan, Korea) – mokryeon, kobus magnolia, or kobushi magnolia
 Magnolia liliiflora Desr. (central China)
 Magnolia × loebneri Paul Kache (Japan)
 Magnolia salicifolia (Sieb. & Zucc.) Maxim. (Japan)
 Magnolia sargentiana Rehd. & Wilson (W China)
 Magnolia sargentiana var. robusta Rehd. & Wilson (Sichuan (China))
 Magnolia sargentiana var. sargentiana (W China)
 Magnolia × soulangeana Thiéb.-Bern. (hybrid origin)
 Magnolia sprengeri Pampan (Sichuan (China))
 Magnolia sprengeri var. elongata (Rehd. & Wilson) Johnstone (Sichuan (China))
 Magnolia sprengeri var. sprengeri (Sichuan (China))
 Magnolia stellata (Sieb. & Zucc.) Maxim. (Japan)
 Magnolia zenii Cheng (E China)

Subsection Tulipastrum
 Magnolia acuminata (L.) L. (E North America)
 Magnolia acuminata var. acuminata (E North America)
 Magnolia acuminata var. subcordata (Spach) Dandy (SE US)

Section Michelia

Subsection Michelia
 Magnolia × alba (DC.) Figlar & Noot. (hybrid origin)
 Magnolia angustioblonga (Law & Wu) Figlar (SW China)
 Magnolia baillonii Pierre (SW China, Vietnam)
 Magnolia balansae A.DC. (S China, Vietnam)
 Magnolia banghamii (Noot.) Figlar & Noot. (Malaysia, Sumatra)
 Magnolia braianensis (Gagnep.) Figlar (Vietnam)
 Magnolia cavaleriei (Finet & Gagnep.) Figlar (S China)
 Magnolia champaca (L.) Baillon ex Pierre (S India, Lesser Sunda isl., Java, Malay penn.)
 Magnolia champaca var. champaca (S India, Lesser Sunda isl.)
 Magnolia champaca var. pubinervia (Blume) Figlar & Noot. (Java, Malay penn.)
 Magnolia chapensis (Dandy) Sima (S China, N Vietnam)
 Magnolia citrata Noot. & Chalermglin (NE Thailand)
 Magnolia compressa Maxim. (Japan, SW China)
 Magnolia coriacea (H.T. Chang & B.L. Chen) Figlar (SE Yunnan (China))
 Magnolia doltsopa (Buch.-Ham. Ex DC.) Figlar (SW China, Himalayas)
 Magnolia elegantifolia Noot. (Zhejiang (China))
 Magnolia ernestii Figlar. (Sichuan (China))
 Magnolia ernestii subsp. ernestii (Sichuan (China))
 Magnolia ernestii subsp. szechuanica (Dandy) Sima & Figlar (Sichuan (China))
 Magnolia figo (Lour.) DC. (SE China)
 Magnolia figo var. crassipes (Law) Figlar & Noot. (SE China)
 Magnolia figo var. figo . (SE China)
 Magnolia figo var. skinneriana ined. (SE China)
 Magnolia flaviflora (Law & Wu) Figlar (Vietnam, SW China)
 Magnolia floribunda (Finet & Gagnep.) Figlar. (S China, Vietnam)
 Magnolia foveolata (Merr. Ex Dandy) Figlar (S China, Vietnam)
 Magnolia fujianensis (Q.F.Zheng) Figlar (SE China)
 Magnolia fulva (H.T. Chang & B.L. Chen) Figlar (Yunnan (China), Vietnam?)
 Magnolia fulva var. calcicola Sima & Yu (Yunnan (China))
 Magnolia fulva var. fulva . (Yunnan (China))
 Magnolia gioi (A.Chevalier) Noot. (S China, Vietnam)
 Magnolia guangdongensis (Y.H.Yan, Q.W.Zeng & F.W.Xing) Noot. (Guandong (China))
 Magnolia guangxiensis (Law & R.Z.Zhou) Sima (Guangxi (China))
 Magnolia hypolampra (Dandy) Figlar (S China, Vietnam)
 Magnolia iteophylla (C.Y.Wu ex Y.W.Law & Y.F.Wu) Noot. (Yunnan (China))
 Magnolia kingii (Dandy) Figlar (Bangladesh, Assam)
 Magnolia kisopa (Bush.-Ham. ex DC.) Figlar (Vietnam, Nepal)
 Magnolia koordersiana (Noot.) Figlar (Malaysia, W Sumatra)
 Magnolia lacei (W.W.Smith) Figlar (SW China, Vietnam)
 Magnolia laevifolia (Law & Y.F.Wu) Noot. (Yunnan (China))
 Magnolia lanuginosa (Wall.) Figlar & Noot. (Yunnan (China), Nepal)
 Magnolia leveilleana (Dandy) Figlar (SW China)
 Magnolia macclurei (Dandy) Figlar (S China, N Vietnam)
 Magnolia macclurei var. macclurei. (S China, N Vietnam)
 Magnolia macclurei var. sublanea Dandy (Guangdong (China))
 Magnolia mannii (King) King (Assam)
 Magnolia martinii H.Lev. (SE China, Vietnam)
 Magnolia masticata (Dandy) Figlar (Yunnan (China), Laos)
 Magnolia maudiae (Dunn) Figlar (SE China, Hainan isl.)
 Magnolia maudiae var. hunanensis (C.L.Peng & L.H.Yan) Sima (Hunan (China))
 Magnolia maudiae var. maudiae (SE China, Hainan Isl.)
 Magnolia maudiae var. platypetala (Hand.-Mazz.) Sima (s.central China)
 Magnolia mediocris (Dandy) Figlar (S China, Vietnam)
 Magnolia microcarpa (B.L.Chen & S.C.Yang) Sima (S China)
 Magnolia microtricha (Hand.-Mazz.) Figlar. (Yunnan (China))
 Magnolia montana (Blume) Figlar & Noot. (Malaysia to Borneo)
 Magnolia nilagirica (Zenker) Figlar (S India, Sri Lanka)
 Magnolia oblonga (Wall. Ex Hook.f. & Thomson) Figlar. (Assam)
 Magnolia odora (Chun) Figlar & Noot. (SE China, N Vietnam)
 Magnolia opipara (H.T.Chang & B.L.Chen) Sima (Yunnan (China))
 Magnolia philippinensis P.Pharm (Philippines)
 Magnolia punduana (Hook.f. & Thoms.) Figlar (Assam)
 Magnolia rajaniana (Craib.) Figlar. (Thailand)
 Magnolia scortechinii (King) Figlar & Noot. (Malay penn., W Sumatra)
 Magnolia shiluensis (Chun & Y.F.Wu) Figlar (Hainan isl.)
 Magnolia sirindhorniae Noot. & Chalermglin (Thailand)
 Magnolia sphaerantha (C.Y.Wu ex Z.S.Yue) Sima (SW China)
 Magnolia subulifera (Dandy) Figlar (Vietnam)
 Magnolia sumatrae (Dandy) Figlar & Noot. (Malaysia, Sumatra)
 Magnolia xanthantha (C.Y.Wu ex Law & Y.F.Wu) Figlar (Yunnan (China))

Subsection Elmerrillia 
 Magnolia platyphylla (Merr.) Figlar & Noot. (Philippines)
 Magnolia pubescens (Merr.) Figlar & Noot. (Philippines)
 Magnolia sulawesiana Brambach, Noot. & Culmsee (Sulawesi)
 Magnolia tsiampacca (L.) Figlar & Noot. (Sumatra, Borneo, Sulawesi, Moluccas, New Guinea, Bismarck Archipelago)
 Magnolia tsiampacca subsp. mollis (Dandy) Figlar & Noot. (Sumatra, Borneo)
 Magnolia tsiampacca subsp. tsiampacca (Sulawesi, Moluccas, New Guinea, Bismarck Archipelago)
 Magnolia tsiampacca subsp. tsiampacca var. glaberrima (Dandy) Figlar & Noot. (New Guinea)
 Magnolia tsiampacca subsp. tsiampacca var. tsiampacca (Sulawesi, Moluccas, New Guinea, Bismarck Archipelago)
 Magnolia vrieseana (Miq.) Baill. ex Pierre (Sulawesi, Moluccas)

Subsection Maingola
 Magnolia annamensis Dandy (Vietnam)
 Magnolia carsonii Dandy ex Noot. (Borneo, Celebes)
 Magnolia carsonii var. carsonii (Borneo)
 Magnolia carsonii var. drymifolia Noot. (Borneo)
 Magnolia carsonii var. phaulanta (Dandy ex Noot.) S.Kim (Celebes)
 Magnolia cathcartii (Hook.f. & Thoms.) Noot. (SW China, Burma)
 Magnolia griffithii King (India, Assam)
 Magnolia gustavii King (India, Assam)
 Magnolia macklottii (Korth.) Dandy (W Java, Borneo, Sumatra)
 Magnolia macklottii var. beccariana (Agostini) Noot. (Sumatra)
 Magnolia macklottii var. macklottii (W Java, Borneo)
 Magnolia pealiana King (Assam)

Subsection Aromadendron
 Magnolia ashtonii Dandy ex. Noot. (Sumatra, Borneo)
 Magnolia bintuluensis (Agostini) Noot. (Sumatra, Borneo)
 Magnolia borneensis Noot. (Borneo, Philippines)
 Magnolia elegans (Blume) Keng (Sumatra, Java)
 Magnolia pahangensis Noot. (Borneo, Philippines)

Subgenus Gynopodium

Section Gynopodium
 Magnolia kachirachirai (Kanehira & Yamamoto) Dandy (Taiwan)
 Magnolia lotungensis Chun & Tsoon (S China)
 Magnolia nitida W.W.Smith (NW Yunnan (China))
 Magnolia omeiensis (Hu & Cheng) Dandy (Sichuan (China))
 Magnolia yunnanensis (Hu) Noot. (SE Yunnan (China))

Section Manglietiastrum
 Magnolia pleiocarpa (Dandy) Figlar & Noot. (Assam)
 Magnolia praecalva (Dandy) Figlar & Noot. (Vietnam, Malay penn.)
 Magnolia sinica (Law) Noot. (SE Yunnan (China))

Uses

Horticultural uses

In general,  the genus Magnolia has attracted horticultural interest. Some, such as the shrub M. stellata (star magnolia) and the tree M. × soulangeana (saucer magnolia) flower quite early in the spring, before the leaves open. Others flower in late spring or early summer, including M. virginiana (sweetbay magnolia) and M. grandiflora (southern magnolia).

Hybridisation has been immensely successful in combining the best aspects of different species to give plants which flower at an earlier age than the parent species, as well as having more impressive flowers. One of the most popular garden magnolias, M. × soulangeana, is a hybrid of M. liliiflora and M. denudata.

In the eastern United States, five native species are frequently in cultivation: M. acuminata (as a shade tree), M. grandiflora, M. virginiana, M. tripetala, and M. macrophylla. The last two species must be planted where high winds are not a frequent problem because of the large size of their leaves.

Culinary uses
The flowers of many species are considered edible. In parts of England, the petals of M. grandiflora are pickled and used as a spicy condiment. In some Asian cuisines, the buds are pickled and used to flavor rice and scent tea. In Japan, the young leaves and flower buds of Magnolia hypoleuca are broiled and eaten as a vegetable. Older leaves are made into a powder and used as seasoning; dried, whole leaves are placed on a charcoal brazier and filled with miso, leeks, daikon, and shiitake, and broiled. There is a type of miso which is seasoned with magnolia, hoba miso.

Traditional medicine

The bark and flower buds of M. officinalis have long been used in traditional Chinese medicine, where they are known as hou po (厚朴). In Japan, kōboku, M. obovata, has been used in a similar manner.

Timber
The cucumbertree, M. acuminata, grows to large size and is harvested as a timber tree in northeastern US forests. Its wood is sold as "yellow poplar" along with that of the tuliptree, Liriodendron tulipifera. The Fraser magnolia, M. fraseri, also attains enough size sometimes to be harvested, as well.

Other uses
Magnolias are used as food plants by the larvae of some Lepidoptera species, including the giant leopard moth.

Chemical compounds and bioeffects
The aromatic bark contains magnolol, honokiol, 4-O-methylhonokiol, and obovatol. Magnolol and honokiol activate the nuclear receptor peroxisome proliferator-activated receptor gamma.

Culture

Symbols
 White or Yulan magnolia (subgenus Yulania) is the official flower of the Chinese metropolis Shanghai.
Magnolia grandiflora is the official state flower of both Mississippi and Louisiana. The flower's abundance in Mississippi is reflected in its nickname of "Magnolia State" and the state flag. The magnolia is also the official state tree of Mississippi. One of the many nicknames for the city of Houston is "Magnolia City".  Historically, magnolias have been associated with the Southern United States.
Magnolia sieboldii is the national flower of North Korea.
Magnolia sieboldii is the official flower of Gangnam.

Arts

Film and television
Paul Thomas Anderson created a movie titled Magnolia.
Steel Magnolias is a 1989 American comedy-drama film about the bond among a group of women from Louisiana, who can be as beautiful as magnolias, but are as tough as steel. The name 'magnolia' specifically refers to a magnolia tree about which they are arguing at the beginning.

Music
 The folksong "Bungong Jeumpa", from Aceh, Indonesia, means magnolia flower.
 The French song by Salvatore Adamo "Les collines de Rabiah" in the 1970s describes the magnolia trees in Beirut and calls for peace.
 The Grateful Dead recorded a song titled "Sugar Magnolia" that was first released on the 1970 album  American Beauty.  The song made its live debut on June 7, 1970, at the Fillmore West in San Francisco. The semiofficial 1972 Dead movie Sunshine Daydream has its title taken from the song's coda section.
 Tom Petty and the Heartbreakers second studio album You're Gonna Get It! includes a track called "Magnolia", written by Tom Petty.
 J.J. Cale (1938–2013) wrote a song about a woman named Magnolia, which has been covered by Poco, Beck and Lucinda Williams.
 "The Scent of Magnolia" is the first track in David Sylvian's compilation album, Everything and Nothing.
 In 2003, Songs: Ohia released The Magnolia Electric Co. This was the last release under that project's name for Jason Molina before renaming his band Magnolia Electric Co. after the album.
 "Magnolia" is the fifth track on Australian indie rock group Gang of Youths' debut album, The Positions.
 "Magnolia" is a hit song by rapper Playboi Carti
 In his song titled "Marry Me" Thomas Rhett mentions the magnolia flower.
 In his song titled "Roller Coaster" Danny Vera mentions the magnolia flower.
 "The Sweet Magnolia Tree" is the eighth track on Doug Wamble's 2003 CD Country Libations.
 Singer-songwriter Brian Fallon of The Gaslight Anthem  included  "Honey Magnolia" to his first solo debut album titled Painkillers released in March 2016.
 "Magnolia" is an album by progressive rock band The Pineapple Thief. It includes a track called "Magnolia".

Literature
 The 1989 movie Steel Magnolias is based on a 1987 play, Steel Magnolias, by Robert Harling.
 In the 1939 song "Strange Fruit", originally written as a poem by New York schoolteacher and communist activist Abel Meeropol to condemn the practice of lynching, the magnolia flower was referred to as being associated with the Southern United States, where many lynchings took place:
Pastoral scene of the gallant south
The bulging eyes and the twisted mouth
Scent of magnolias, sweet and fresh,
Then the sudden smell of burning flesh.
Despite Meeropol's frequent mention of the South and magnolia trees, the horrific image which inspired his poem, Lawrence Beitler's 1930 photograph capturing the lynching of Thomas Shipp and Abram Smith following the robbery and murder of Claude Deteer, actually occurred in Marion, Indiana, where magnolia trees are less common.
 In the 1960s, magnolias were a symbol of the South in the popular press: the New York Post noted of Lyndon Johnson that "A man who wore a ten-gallon Stetson and spoke with a magnolia accent had little hope of winning the Democratic nomination in 1960", and biographer Robert Caro picks up the symbol by saying that when Johnson became president "[t]he taint of magnolias still remained to be scrubbed off."

Visual arts

The Canadian artist, Sarah Maloney, has created a series of sculptures of magnolia flowers in bronze and steel, entitled First Flowers, in which she draws our attention to the dual symbols of beginnings in the flower, as both an evolutionary archetype and also one of the first trees to flower in spring (see illustration).

See also
 List of AGM magnolias

Notes

References

Bibliography

External links

Magnolia images at the Arnold Arboretum of Harvard University Plant Image Database
Friedman, William (Ned). "Hunting magnolia fruits at the Arboretum." Posts from the Collection, Arnold Arboretum of Harvard University website, 20 October 2019. Accessed 29 April 2020.
Dosmann, Michael and Nancy Rose. "Early to Evolve, Early to Flower: Collections Up Close Spotlights the Magnolia Collection." Arnold Arboretum of Harvard University website, Spring/Summer 2014. Accessed 29 April 2020.
"Magnolia - April Tree of the Month." Arnold Arboretum of Harvard University, 2014. Accessed 29 April 2020.
Glasser, Larissa. "Magnolia madness in April." Blog of the Arnold Arboretum Horticultural Library, Arnold Arboretum of Harvard University website, 19 April 2017. Accessed 29 April 2020.

 
 
 
 

 
Magnoliales genera
Culture of the Southern United States
Medicinal plants
National symbols of North Korea
Plants used in traditional Chinese medicine
Symbols of Louisiana
Symbols of Mississippi